The 1984 UCLA Bruins football team was an American football team that represented the University of California, Los Angeles during the 1984 NCAA Division I-A football season.  In their ninth year under head coach Terry Donahue, the Bruins compiled a 9–3 record (5–2 Pac-10), finished in a tie for third place in the Pacific-10 Conference, and were ranked #9 in the final AP Poll.  The Bruins went on to defeat Miami in the 1985 Fiesta Bowl. Gaston Green and James Washington were named the offensive and defensive most valuable players in the 1985 Fiesta Bowl.

UCLA's offensive leaders in 1984 were quarterback Steve Bono with 1,333 passing yards, running back Danny Andrews with 605 rushing yards, and wide receiver Mike Sherrard with 635 receiving yards.

Schedule

Roster

Rankings

Game summaries

at San Diego State

Nebraska

Colorado

USC

vs. Miami (FL) (Fiesta Bowl)

1985 NFL Draft
The following players were drafted into professional football following the season.

References

UCLA
UCLA Bruins football seasons
Fiesta Bowl champion seasons
UCLA Bruins football